The Husband That Is Necessary to Follow   is a 1948 Argentine film directed by Augusto Cesar Vatteone and written by Tito Insausti. The film starred Francisco Álvarez, Ana Arneodo, Mapy Cortés and Pedro Quartucci.

Cast
Francisco Álvarez
Ana Arneodo
Yvonne Bastien (as Ivonne De Lys)
Fernando Campos
Mapy Cortés
Néstor Deval
Enrique García Satur
Iris Portillo
Pedro Quartucci
Alberto Terrones

Release and acclaim
The film premiered on 14 September 1948.

External links
 

1948 films
1940s Spanish-language films
Films directed by Augusto César Vatteone
Argentine comedy films
1948 comedy films
Argentine black-and-white films
1940s Argentine films